Connor Matthew Hall (born 18 February 1998) is an English professional footballer who plays as a forward for Chorley.

Progressing through the English football league pyramid featuring for the likes of Binfield and Ascot United, Hall earned himself a move to Football League side Sheffield United in December 2015 and signed his first professional deal just over a year later. Impressive loan spells at Sheffield and Mickleover Sports rewarded Hall with a move to National League side Woking before joining Bolton Wanderers in July 2017. He went on to make his professional debut during their FA Cup third round tie against Huddersfield Town just over six months later, before joining Accrington Stanley on a six-month loan in August 2018.

Ahead of the 2020–21 campaign, Hall returned to Woking on a one-year deal. He later re-joined Chorley on a permanent basis following a short-term loan spell. Connor is the older brother of Chelsea player,
Lewis Hall.

Club career

Sheffield United
After youth spells with Binfield, Eldon Celtic and Ascot United, Hall joined Football League side Sheffield United in December 2015 on a scholar basis. On 6 May 2016, Hall signed his first professional contract along with fellow academy players; Aaron Ramsdale, Shea Gordon, Kimarni Smith and Nathaniel Crofts.

In September 2016, Hall joined Northern Premier League Division One South side Sheffield on a three-month loan deal. On 10 September 2016, Hall made his Sheffield debut in their 4–2 home victory over Rugby Town, featuring for 89 minutes before being replaced by Pat Lindley. After a month at Sheffield, Hall finally registered his first goal for the club in their 3–0 home victory over Basford United. Following his first goal for the club, Hall went on to net twelve more times for Sheffield, scoring four during their 5–2 victory against Northwich Victoria.

On 6 December 2016, following an impressive loan spell at Sheffield, Hall joined Mickleover Sports on a one-month loan deal. Hall went on to net eleven times in nine games, including five in Mickleover's 7–0 victory against Ilkeston on 26 December 2016.

On 5 January 2017, Hall joined National League side Woking on a one-month loan deal. Two days later, Hall made his Woking debut during their 2–1 away defeat against Wrexham, featuring up until the 71st minute before being replaced by Chike Kandi. On 7 February 2017, Hall's loan spell was extended for a further month. On 17 April 2017, Hall scored his first goal for Woking in their 3–2 comeback against Chester, scoring the equalising goal for the Cards, before fellow forward Gozie Ugwu sealed the victory in the 90th minute.

Bolton Wanderers
On 3 July 2017, following his release from Sheffield United, Hall joined Championship side Bolton Wanderers on a one-year deal following a successful trial period. On 6 January 2018, Hall made his professional debut during Bolton's FA Cup third round tie against Huddersfield Town, replacing Mark Little in the 2–1 defeat. On 6 May 2018, after netting twenty-two times during the 2017–18 under-23 campaign, Hall was rewarded with the Bolton Wanderers Young Player of the Year award.

Despite the club exercising an option to extend Hall's contract for a further year in early June, he subsequently signed a new two-year deal later that month with a view to more first-team football. On 14 August 2018, Hall made his first start for Bolton during their 2–1 defeat against Leeds United in their EFL Cup first round tie, featuring up until the 65th minute.

On 31 August 2018, Hall joined League One side, Accrington Stanley on loan until January 2019. Hall made his Bolton league debut on 18 January 2020 as a late substitute for Ronan Darcy in a 0–1 defeat against Portsmouth. Six days later Hall signed for Chorley on loan for the rest of the season. He made his Chorley debut on 25 January, starting in a 0–1 defeat against Halifax Town. On 26 June, it was announced Hall would be one of 14 senior players released at the end of his contract on 30 June.

Woking
On 14 August 2020, following his release from Bolton, Hall returned to National League side Woking on a one-year deal.
On 30 October 2020, Hall returned to Chorley on a short-term loan.

Chorley
Hall scored an extra time winning goal in the FA Cup first round against League one side Wigan Athletic at the DW Stadium. In the second round Hall scored the equalising goal to make it 1-1 in the 60th minute, as Chorley came back to knock league one side Peterborough United out 2-1 at London Road, with the winning goal coming from Lewis Baines in the 62nd minute  On 24 December, Chorley signed him permanently.

Following a disrupted 2020–21 campaign due to COVID-19, Hall scored his first goals of the 2021–22 season during Chorley's 9–0 thrashing of Gloucester City in September 2021, netting in the 31st and 61st minute.

Following three goals in four matches with Chorley firmly in the play-off picture, Hall won the December 2022 Player of the Month award for the National League North.

Career statistics

Honours
Individual
Bolton Wanderers Young Player of the Year: 2017–18
National League North Player of the Month: December 2022

References

External links

1998 births
Living people
Sportspeople from Slough
English footballers
Association football forwards
Binfield F.C. players
Ascot United F.C. players
Sheffield United F.C. players
Sheffield F.C. players
Mickleover Sports F.C. players
Woking F.C. players
Bolton Wanderers F.C. players
Accrington Stanley F.C. players
Chorley F.C. players
Northern Premier League players
National League (English football) players
English Football League players
Footballers from Berkshire